ADHM may refer to
ADHM construction in mathematical physics 
Advanced Healthcare Materials, a scientific journal which uses the adhm abbreviation for its digital object identifier
Ae Dil Hai Mushkil, a 2016 Indian film
Airtel Delhi Half Marathon